Arouva is a genus of snout moths. It was described by Francis Walker in 1864.

Species
 Arouva albivitta (C. Felder, R. Felder & Rogenhofer, 1875)
 Arouva castanealis Hampson, 1906
 Arouva mirificana Walker, 1864

References

Chrysauginae
Pyralidae genera